Christoffer Carlsen (born 6 May 1992) is a Swedish swimmer. He competed in the men's 50 metre freestyle event at the 2018 FINA World Swimming Championships (25 m), in Hangzhou, China.

References

External links
 

1992 births
Living people
Swedish male freestyle swimmers
Place of birth missing (living people)
20th-century Swedish people
21st-century Swedish people